Mary Anne Tauskey (born December 3, 1955, in Suffern, New York) is an American equestrian and Olympic medalist. She was a member of the gold medal team in eventing at the 1976 Summer Olympics in Montreal, Quebec, Canada. Riding Marcus Aurelius, Mary Anne Tauskey placed 20th and, as the high scorer on the U.S. team, her result was not taken into account when calculating the team scores. She was also a member of the 1975 Pan Am Games eventing gold medal team and was named USEA Rider of the Year in 1977.

References

1955 births
Living people
American event riders
Equestrians at the 1976 Summer Olympics
American female equestrians
Olympic gold medalists for the United States in equestrian
People from Suffern, New York
Medalists at the 1976 Summer Olympics